Louis Ángelo Peña (born 12 December 1989 in Mérida, Venezuela) is a Venezuelan footballer who currently plays for Estudiantes. He has formerly played for Portuguese Liga team Portimonense.

Career
Peña started his career in 2006 for his first club Estudiantes de Mérida in which he played 52 times and scored 6 goals. On 28 May 2009, he was signed by Portuguese club Braga for an undisclosed fee.

International career
He was called up to the Venezuela U20 squad in 2009 and as well as the senior national team.

References

External links
 
 
 SC Braga sign young prospect from Venezuela
 

1989 births
Living people
People from Mérida, Mérida
Venezuelan footballers
Venezuela international footballers
Estudiantes de Mérida players
Deportivo La Guaira players
S.C. Braga players
Portimonense S.C. players
Caracas FC players
Clube Náutico Capibaribe players
A.C.C.D. Mineros de Guayana players
Deportivo Táchira F.C. players
Zamora FC players
Azerbaijan Premier League players
Shamakhi FK players
Venezuelan expatriate footballers
Expatriate footballers in Portugal
Expatriate footballers in Brazil
Expatriate footballers in Azerbaijan
Association football midfielders
Venezuelan expatriate sportspeople in Portugal
Venezuelan expatriate sportspeople in Brazil
Venezuelan expatriate sportspeople in Azerbaijan